Saint Joseph's dreams are four dreams described in the Gospel of Matthew in the New Testament in which Joseph, the legal father of Jesus, is visited by an angel of the Lord and receives specific instructions and warnings of impending danger. All four dreams come from the period around the Nativity of Jesus and his early life, between the onset of Mary's pregnancy and the family's return from the Flight to Egypt. They are often distinguished by numbers as "Joseph's first dream" and so on.  Especially in art history, the first may be referred to as the Annunciation to Joseph.

Biblical accounts
The four dreams are as follows:

 First dream: In , Joseph is told not to be afraid to take Mary as his wife, because she has conceived by the Holy Spirit.
 Second dream: In , Joseph is warned to leave Bethlehem and flee to Egypt.
 Third dream: In , while in Egypt, Joseph is told that it is safe to go back to Israel.
 Fourth dream: In , because he had been warned in a dream, Joseph awakens to depart for the region of Galilee instead of going to Judea.

Commentary
Roger Baxter, in his Meditations reflects on the second dream, writing: "Ponder the particulars of this command. 1. The angel commands in the name of God, who is the supreme Lord. 2. He delivers the command not to Mary, though she was the more worthy; but to Joseph, because he was the head of the family, and its ordinary superior. 3. He appeared to him in sleep, by which we learn, that even while we sleep the care of God is exerted over us, and He is continually watching for our good. 4. He tells him to take the Child and His mother, without mentioning anything else. Oh that Jesus and Mary were your only care! 5. He assigns them the place of their banishment. Learn, hence, not to choose for yourself, but receive everything in the ordinary way of God's providence, and as coming from His hands, in regard to place, employment, prosperity, and adversity."

In art
The dreams have sometimes been depicted in art, though they have never been among the most common subjects from the Life of Jesus in art or the Life of the Virgin. It is often unclear which dream is intended. The second dream is probably most often depicted, and if there is no other indication it can be assumed that is the subject. If the Virgin Mary is present (but no infant Jesus), especially if visibly pregnant or shown spinning, this suggests the first dream, which tends to be shown in an indoor setting. An outside setting may suggest the second dream, as does the angel pointing outside the picture space, urging Joseph to leave. The tools of his carpentry workshop are often shown around him, probably indicating the second dream, although logically there seems to be no reason why these should not be present for the first and third dreams as well.  The presence of the ox or ass from the Nativity scene suggests the second dream.  In the absence of a place in a sequence, inscribed text, a title, or decor showing a setting in Egypt, the third and fourth dreams can generally be ruled out where there is uncertainty.

Depictions with articles
 Joseph's Dream (Crespi), 1620s, 2nd dream
 Joseph's Dream (Rembrandt, 1645)
 Joseph's Dream, (Studio of Rembrandt, 1650–1655)
 Dream of Saint Joseph, (de La Tour, 1628–1645)

See also

 Chapel of the Milk Grotto
 Nativity of Jesus

Notes

References
James Hall, A History of Ideas and Images in Italian Art, 1983, John Murray, London, 
Schiller, Gertud, Iconography of Christian Art, Vol. I, 1971 (English trans from German), Lund Humphries, London,

External links
Pope Francis. "Joseph the Dreamer", March 20, 2017,  Libreria Editrice Vaticana

Nativity of Jesus in the New Testament
Christian iconography
Saint Joseph (husband of Mary)
Angelic apparitions in the Bible
Gospel of Matthew
Biblical dreams and visions